An art magazine is a publication whose main topic is art. They can be in print form, online, or both and may be aimed at different audiences, including galleries, buyers, amateur or professional artists and the general public. Art magazines can be either trade or consumer magazines or both.

Notable art magazines include:

0–9

 20x20 magazine, arts and literature publication, founded in 2008 in London
 291, 1915–1916, New York City

A

 Aesthetica, est. 2002, United Kingdom
 Afterall, est. 1998/9, London, United Kingdom
 Afterimage, est. 1972, bimonthly journal of media arts and cultural criticism published by the Visual Studies Workshop
 The Aldine, 1869–1879, American art monthly
 American Art Review, est. 1972, American colonial era until the early 1970s
 Aperture, est. 1952, quarterly photography magazine; based in New York City
 Apollo, est. 1925, monthly, based in London, United Kingdom
 ARC Magazine, est. 2011, contemporary Caribbean art and culture
Art almanac: the essential guide to Australia's galleries is a monthly guide to galleries, news and awards in Australia established in 1974.
 Art and Antiques, est. 1984, published out of North Carolina, US
 Art and Architecture Journal, est. 1980, re-launched 2005; UK based
 Art+Auction, owned by Louise Blouin Media
Art & Australia, biannual print magazine, the country's longest-running art journal, in print since 1963
 Art & Project, Dutch art magazine, 1968–1989
ArtAsiaPacific is an English-language periodical covering contemporary art and culture in Asia, the Pacific, and the Middle East. It is published and distributed internationally six times a year.
 Art in America, est. 1913, covers US and international art but concentrated on New York City
Art in Australia was an Australian magazine that was published between 1916 and 1942
 Art in Print, est. 2011, bimonthly art magazine and website on the history and culture of artists' prints
 Art International, 1956–1984, published quarterly in Paris, France
 Art and Antiques, est. 1984, published out of North Carolina, US
 The Art Journal, 1839–1912, London-based monthly journal
 Art Monthly, est. 1976, UK-based coverage of contemporary art
Art Monthly Australasia is a visual arts magazine published since 1987
 The Art Newspaper, est. 1983, international coverage of news from the world of visual arts
 Art on Paper, 1996–2009, based in New York City
 ART PAPERS, based in Atlanta, Georgia, bimonthly contemporary art magazine
 Art Press, est. 1972, based in Paris, monthly bi-lingual (French/English) contemporary art magazine
 Art Press 2, est. 2006, based in Paris, quarterly contemporary art magazine
 ArtAsiaPacific, covers contemporary art in Asia, the Pacific, and the Middle East
Artforum, est. 1962 in San Francisco, now based in New York City
 Arte Al Limite, est. 2002 in Santiago, bimonthly contemporary art magazine
 Artibus Asiae, est. 1925 in Dresden, biannual academic journal specialising in the arts and archaeology of Asia
 Artibus et Historiae, semi-annual journal of art historical research, published by the Institute for Art Historical Research
 Artillery, based in Los Angeles, covers US and international art but concentrated on California
 ARTINFO, owned by Louise Blouin Media
 Artist Profile, est. 2007, Sydney, Australia, contemporary art quarterly covering Asia-Pacific
Artlink, founded in 1981, based in Australia, covers contemporary art of Australia and Asia-Pacific
 Artlog, based in Brooklyn, New York, online only
 Artnet, based in New York City, Berlin and Paris
 ARTnews, founded in 1902, covering ancient to contemporary art
 ArtNexus, leading Latin American contemporary art magazine, est. 1976, based in Bogota and North Miami
 Art Plus Magazine, formerly Contemporary Art Philippines, bi-monthly magazine covering Philippine visual arts
 ArtReview, est. 1949, international contemporary art magazine, based in London
Arts of Asia, est. 1970, quarterly international magazine of Asian arts and antiques
 Arts Magazine, 1926–1992, monthly journal published by Art Digest, Co., New York City
 Asahi Camera, monthly photographic magazine, published in Japan by Asahi Shinbun-sha, publisher of the newspaper The Asahi Shimbun from April 1926 to July 2020
 Asia Art Archive, collection of material on the recent history of art from Asia
 Atlantica Revista de Arte y Pensamiento, Centro Atlántico de Arte de Moderno (CAAM), based in Las Palmas de Gran Canaria, since 1990
 Australian Art Collector, est. 1997, quarterly magazine covering Australian contemporary art, including aboriginal art
 Australian Art Review, Australian quarterly fine arts magazine

B 
 BAK magazine, bilingual Turkish and English visual arts magazine
 Balam, Latin American photography magazine based in Buenos Aires, Argentina
 Beaux Arts Magazine, French magazine
 Bidoun, magazine about arts and culture of the Middle East
 The Bear Deluxe, Portland, Oregon-based magazine dedicated to environmental writing, literature, and visual art
 Beautiful/Decay, began as a 'zine, currently a blog
 Bedeutung, quarterly British publication of philosophy, current affairs, art and literature
 The Blue Review, 1911–1913, London-based arts magazine
 Blueprint, London-based magazine of architecture and design
 BOMB Magazine, quarterly magazine edited by artists and writers, based in New York City, est. 1981
 Border Crossings (magazine), quarterly arts and culture magazine edited and published in Winnipeg, Canada, est. 1982
 The Brooklyn Rail, journal of arts, culture, and politics published monthly in Brooklyn, est. 2000
 Buddhiprakash, est. 1850, based in Gujarat, India, oldest Gujarati language magazine 
 The Burlington Magazine, est. 1903, based in London, England, longest running English-language art journal

C 
 Cabinet, est. 2000 in Brooklyn, New York
 The Calvert Journal, a digital magazine of contemporary New East culture, including art, film, architecture, design and avant-garde culture
 Camera quality international gravure-printed art photography magazine published 1922–1981 in Switzerland
 Camera Craft, 1900–1942, est. by Photographers' Association of California, absorbed by American Photography
 Communication Arts, est. 1959 in Menlo Park, California
 Connaissance des Arts, French Magazine
 Constance, est. 2006, based in New Orleans, Louisiana
 Contemporary, 1993–2008, monthly visual arts magazine based in London
 Creative Boom, 2009, digital magazine
 Culture Lounge, bi-monthly magazine, based in Columbus, Nebraska, founded in 2006
 Contemporary Art Society, an organization encouraging appreciation and understanding of contemporary art in UK.

D
Darling, independent, ad-free, women's magazine with a "no-retouching" policy, based in Los Angeles, founded in 2009
Daruma Magazine, Japanese art magazine, 1994–2011
Derrière le miroir (DLM),  French art magazine published from 1946 to 1982, Paris
Dialogue, 1978–2002, based in Ohio
The Drama, 2000–2007

E 
 Esopus, semi-annual magazine, based in New York City, founded in 2003
 esse arts + opinions, Montreal-based contemporary art magazine, published three times a year
European Photography a bi-lingual art photography magazine.

F 
 Fillip, contemporary art magazine, based in Vancouver, Canada, founded in 2004
First American Art Magazine, quarterly magazine about indigenous art of the Americas, founded in 2013
 Flash Art, bimonthly contemporary art magazine, based in Milan, Italy
 France Amerique, 1943 bilingual cultural magazine
 frieze, London-based contemporary art magazine, founded 1991, published eight times a year
 Frontrunner New York City-based contemporary arts collective and online magazine. Founded 2009
 Frame Frame Contemporary Art Finland is an advocate for Finnish contemporary art.

G 
 Geometricae, geometric abstract art magazine, based in Valencia, Spain, founded in 2015

H 
 High Performance Magazine,  a quarterly performance art and experimental art magazine 1978–1997
 Hunter and Cook, contemporary Canadian arts and culture magazine, 2008–2011
Hyperallergic, online magazine of contemporary art criticism, based in Brooklyn, founded 2009

I 
ImagineFX , magazine of digital art, est. 2006, based in Bath, UK
Die Insel, 1899–1901, Munich, Germany
It is. A Magazine for Abstract Art, NYC-based limited edition fine arts magazine helped create and define abstract expressionism, 1958–1965

J 
 The Jackdaw, British arts magazine, founded 2000
 Juxtapoz, monthly lowbrow art magazine, founded 1994

K 
 KIOSK, art, design and architecture magazine, est. 2007, based in London, UK

L 
 LensCulture, international art of photography, est. 2004
Light vision: Australia's international photography magazine 1977–78 was a bi-monthly Australian photography magazine
 Lodown magazine, bimonthly art, culture and lifestyle magazine featuring sculpture, photography, and graffiti
 Look, published by the Art Gallery Society of New South Wales, Australia

M 
 Magazine of Art, 1878–1904, London- and New York City-based monthly visual arts magazine
 Marg, quarterly Indian art magazine and a publisher of books on the arts, based in Mumbai
 Mavo, Japanese dadaist art magazine, edited by Tatsuo Okada and Tomoyoshi Murayama, published between 1924–1925
 Metronome, founded in the 1996 by the Metronome Press in Paris, France
 Minotaure, 1933–1939, Surrealist-oriented; founded by Albert Skira in Paris, France
 Mir iskusstva, est. 1899 in St. Petersburg, Russia
 Modern Painters, founded 1987, owned by Louise Blouin Media
 Mono.Kultur, est. 2005 in Berlin, Germany
Monopol Magazin, monthly German magazine about Contemporary art
Moving Art Magazine, international art magazine, est. 2007, based in the Netherlands

N 
 New Art Examiner, 1973–2002, based in Chicago, US. 2015 - based in Chicago, US 
 The New&Bad, based in Tel Aviv, Israel, founded as a part of Maayan poetry magazine
The New Criterion, a New York-based review of the arts and intellectual life
 Nictoglobe, founded in 1982, online only
 n.paradoxa established in 1996, covering feminist art criticism and the work of contemporary women artists
 Neural magazine est. in 1993,  based in Bari, Italy, quarterly magazine about digital culture and media arts

P 

 Parkett, from Zurich, Switzerland
The Pastel Journal
Pelican Bomb, online art review on contemporary visual arts in New Orleans, 2011–2018
Photofile is a photography journal published since 1983 by the Australian Centre for Photography
Photosho, showcasing Canadian photographers, defunct
Plazm, founded 1991
The Portfolio, 1870–1893
Portfolio Magazine, 1979–1983
Print Connoisseur, 1920–1932, New York City-based quarterly magazine
Print Quarterly, quarterly magazine and a scholarly journal on prints based in London, founded in 1984 by David Landau
Professional Artist, the American art industry's foremost business magazine for visual artists, est. 1986

R 
 Raw Vision, UK-based, devoted to outsider art
 Reorient, Canada-based, covering contemporary Middle Eastern arts and culture
 Revolutionart, bi-monthly contemporary art online magazine
 Revue Noire, Paris, 1991–2001

S 
 Sculpture, published by the International Sculpture Center
 Sensitive Skin Magazine, online magazine of the arts
 Spike Art Quarterly, in print and online, published in Vienna 
 Southwest Art, in print and online, magazine specializing in art of the American Southwest
 Studio International, art and design magazine founded in 1893 under the name The Studio: An Illustrated Magazine of Fine and Applied Art, in print 1963–1994, presently online only

T 
 Tate Etc., art magazine published by the Tate, London, previously published under various names
 Texte zur Kunst, German contemporary art magazine
 The Art Newspaper, monthly newspaper about the visual arts based in London established in 1983
 Third Text, founded by Rasheed Araeen, London
 Toby Room, founded by Jared Pappas-Kelley and Michael Lent in 2001, United States
 TradeArt, defunct
 Triple Canopy
Toons Mag, Cartoon Magazine based in Norway established in 2009
Two Coats of Paint, founded by Sharon Butler in 2007

W
Wallpaper*
Watercolor Artist
White Fungus
Whitehot (magazine)

X
X, London, 1959–1962
X-TRA Contemporary Art Quarterly, Los Angeles-based quarterly magazine with a focus on contemporary art criticism, founded in 1997

Y
The Yankee, 1828–1829, founded by first American art critic John Neal

Z
Zingmagazine

See also
 List of art reference books

References

Lists of magazines
Arts-related lists